This article provides information on candidates who stood for the 1958 Australian federal election. The election was held on 22 November 1958.

By-elections, appointments and defections

By-elections and appointments
On 11 April 1956, Victor Kearney (Labor) was elected unopposed to replace Billy Davies (Labor) as the member for Cunningham.
On 28 August 1956, George Hannan (Liberal) was appointed a Victorian Senator to replace John Spicer (Liberal).
On 13 October 1956, Jim Forbes (Liberal) was elected to replace Archie Cameron (Liberal) as the member for Barker.
On 8 December 1956, Les Bury (Liberal) was elected to replace Sir Eric Harrison (Liberal) as the member for Wentworth.
On 6 June 1957, Charles Sandford (Labor) was appointed a Victorian Senator to replace Jack Devlin (Labor).
On 15 September 1957, Doug Anthony (Country) was elected to replace Larry Anthony (Country) as the member for Richmond.
On 8 March 1958, Sir Garfield Barwick (Liberal) was elected to replace Howard Beale (Liberal) as the member for Parramatta.
On 30 July 1958, James Ormonde (Labor) was appointed a New South Wales Senator to replace Bill Ashley (Labor).
On 12 August 1958, Tom Drake-Brockman (Country) was appointed a Western Australian Senator to replace Harrie Seward (Country).
On 11 October 1958, Harry Bruce (Labor), the member for Leichhardt, died. Due to the proximity of the election, no by-election was held.

Defections
In 1957, Queensland Labor Senator Condon Byrne switched to the Queensland Labor Party.
In 1958, Labor MP Charles Morgan (Reid) lost preselection. He contested the election as an independent.

Retiring Members and Senators

Labor
 Cyril Chambers MP (Adelaide, SA)
 Robert Holt MP (Darebin, Vic)
 Rowley James MP (Hunter, NSW)
 Herbert Johnson MP (Kalgoorlie, WA)
 David Watkins MP (Newcastle, NSW)
Senator Jack Critchley (SA)
Senator James Fraser (WA)
Senator Donald Grant (NSW)
Senator John Harris (WA)
Senator John Ryan (SA)

Liberal
 Sir Philip McBride MP (Wakefield, SA)

Country
 William Brand MP (Wide Bay, Qld)
 Sir Arthur Fadden MP (McPherson, Qld)

House of Representatives
Sitting members at the time of the election are shown in bold text. Successful candidates are highlighted in the relevant colour. Where there is possible confusion, an asterisk (*) is also used.

Australian Capital Territory

New South Wales

Northern Territory

Queensland

South Australia

Tasmania

Victoria

Western Australia

Senate
Sitting Senators are shown in bold text. Tickets that elected at least one Senator are highlighted in the relevant colour. Successful candidates are identified by an asterisk (*).

New South Wales
Six seats were up for election. One of these was a short-term vacancy caused by Labor Senator Bill Ashley's death; this had been filled in the interim by Labor's James Ormonde. The Labor Party was defending four seats. The Liberal-Country Coalition was defending two seats. Senators John Armstrong (Labor), John McCallum (Liberal), Albert Reid (Country) and Bill Spooner (Liberal) were not up for re-election.

Queensland
Five seats were up for election. The Liberal-Country Coalition was defending three seats. The Labor Party was defending two seats (although Senator Condon Byrne had defected to the Queensland Labor Party). Senators Archie Benn (Labor), Walter Cooper (Country), Ben Courtice (Labor), Neil O'Sullivan (Liberal) and Dame Annabelle Rankin (Liberal) were not up for re-election.

South Australia

Five seats were up for election. The Labor Party was defending three seats. The Liberal Party was defending two seats. Senators Nancy Buttfield (Liberal), Clive Hannaford (Liberal), Ted Mattner (Liberal), Theo Nicholls (Labor) and Sid O'Flaherty (Labor) were not up for re-election.

Tasmania

Five seats were up for election. The Labor Party was defending three seats (although Senator George Cole had defected to the Democratic Labor Party). The Liberal Party was defending two seats. Senators Denham Henty (Liberal), Nick McKenna (Labor), Bob Poke (Labor), Robert Wardlaw (Liberal) and Reg Wright (Liberal) were not up for re-election.

Victoria

Six seats were up for election. One of these was a short-term vacancy caused by Liberal Senator John Spicer's resignation; this had been filled in the interim by Liberal George Hannan. The Labor Party was defending three seats. The Liberal Party was defending three seats. Senators Don Cameron (Labor), Frank McManus (Democratic Labor), Jim Sheehan (Labor) and Harrie Wade (Country) were not up for re-election.

Western Australia

Five seats were up for election. The Labor Party was defending three seats. The Liberal Party was defending one seat. The Country Party was defending one seat. Senators Shane Paltridge (Liberal), Agnes Robertson (Country), Dorothy Tangney (Labor), Seddon Vincent (Liberal) and Don Willesee (Labor) were not up for re-election.

Summary by party 

Beside each party is the number of seats contested by that party in the House of Representatives for each state, as well as an indication of whether the party contested Senate elections in each state.

See also
 1958 Australian federal election
 Members of the Australian House of Representatives, 1955–1958
 Members of the Australian House of Representatives, 1958–1961
 Members of the Australian Senate, 1956–1959
 Members of the Australian Senate, 1959–1962
 List of political parties in Australia

References
Adam Carr's Election Archive - House of Representatives 1958
Adam Carr's Election Archive - Senate 1958

1958 in Australia
Candidates for Australian federal elections